Joan Kahn (April 13, 1914 – October 12, 1994) was a New York City-based American author, anthologist, and editor, widely regarded as the preeminent mystery/suspense editor of her time.<ref name=AB:EotC>Boucher, Anthony. "Criminals at Large". The New York Times Book Review'. November 13, 1967.</ref> Described variously as the "doyenne of suspense," "the doyenne of mystery editors," and "publishing's grande dame of detective stories," Kahn first came to prominence during her extended reign (1946-1980) at Harper & Brothers (later Harper & Row), much of it spent creating and overseeing the longstanding "Harper Novel of Suspense" series. The Joan Kahn imprint, instituted during her Harper tenure, soon became a sought-after imprimatur for mystery connoisseurs. Some of Kahn's more celebrated signings include John Creasey, Patricia Highsmith, Julian Symons, Dick Francis, and Tony Hillerman.

Early life
Born and raised in New York City, Kahn was the eldest child of architect Eli Jacques Kahn and Elsie [Plaut] Kahn, and the sister of writer E.J. Kahn. An alumna of the Horace Mann School, the Yale School of Art, Barnard College, and the Art Students League of New York, Kahn wrote one children's book (which she also illustrated), '''Ladies and Gentlemen' said the Ringmaster (1938), and two novels, To Meet Miss Long (1943) and Open House (1946), before embarking on her editorial career.

Career
Neither immediate nor by design, Kahn's career change was, in fact, incremental, circuitous, and, on Kahn's part, entirely unwitting. Her initial employment at Harper was as a manuscript reader, only later being recruited by Frederick Lewis Allen as an editor at Harper's Magazine, before finally being brought back by Harper & Brothers to help overhaul the publisher's antiquated mystery department. Even after these respective promotions, Kahn had no inkling that her current livelihood was soon to become her life's work. Both her training and her aspirations at that time were primarily in the visual arts; aside from being a published author, Kahn was both a painter and a sculptor, as well as a stage and costume designer.

As she would tell The New York Times in 1968, Kahn initially viewed the Harper job as merely a "temporary thing," and never more so than when poring through roughly 200 previously rejected manuscripts, the reevaluation of which was one of the first tasks assigned the fledgling "Harper Novels of Suspense" team. However, when one of the handful she ended up accepting, The Horizontal Man by Helen Eustis, went on to win the Mystery Writers of America's annual Edgar Award for best first novel of 1947, Kahn quickly reconsidered. Her initial misgivings forgotten, Kahn aggressively pursued her newfound calling. Speaking with The Chicago Tribune in 1990, shortly after her retirement, she recalled:
I was so bloody lucky. Here I was, absolutely untrained and a dame. In those days, women didn't get many jobs in publishing. I was a snotty little girl... I was scared. I didn't know what I was doing. But I happened to be working for very bright people, who gave me my head. They allowed me to play.

This freedom allowed Kahn to wield extraordinary power, purging Harper of the majority of its largely hidebound roster of mystery writers, sparing only John Dickson Carr and Nicholas Blake (aka C. Day Lewis).

As an editor, Kahn was both devoted to her authors and extremely demanding – by her own account, "a nasty editor." She would not buy a book until it was fully fit to print; to that end, she worked long hours collaborating with her prospective authors. Moreover, no amount of previously successful collaborations between Kahn and a given author guaranteed publication of that author's next novel.

Appearing in The New York Times in November 1967, Anthony Boucher's enthusiastic review of the first of 11 suspense anthologies Kahn would produce over the following twenty years provides a concise summary of the previous twenty:
One of the best editors I know has never had her name on a book until this season. You know the reliable quality of the "Harper Novels of Suspense," and the disproportionate frequency with which they turn up on my Best-of-the-Year lists. Well, it is Joan Kahn who has, over the past two decades, made the Harper imprint meaningful in suspense, who made us acquainted with the giants of the modern English school (Julian Symons, Andrew Garve, Michael Gilbert, etc.), who taught John Creasey and the American public how to discover each other, who introduced probably the most important new suspense writers of the 1960s (Nicolas Freeling and Dick Francis) - and if her track record with American authors is less impressive, still John Ball, Ed Lacy and Elizabeth Linington are not precisely negligible.

In fact, few better examples could be found of Kahn's tough-love approach to editing than her 1965 collaboration with the then largely unknown John Ball; in coaxing from him the Edgar Award-winning In the Heat of the Night (itself the basis of the multi-award-winning film of the same name, starring Sidney Poitier and Rod Steiger), Kahn's accomplishment, at least as perceived by critic and fellow editor Otto Penzler, was Svengali-like:
Ball, in spite of creating the iconic Virgil Tibbs, was an excruciatingly bad writer, his prose more wooden than Sherwood Forest. He had a terrific idea for a novel, assigning a black policeman down South to work with a redneck sheriff, and sent it off to the greatest mystery editor who ever lived, Joan Kahn. She painstakingly worked with Ball to rewrite again and again, finally pulling a book out of him that was good enough to win the Edgar Allan Poe Award.

Two of Kahn's key seventies signings, Tony Hillerman and Joseph Hansen, not only unleashed two hitherto frustrated novelists, but also introduced two groundbreaking American protagonists, Hillerman's Navajo Tribal Police Lieutenant Joe Leaphorn and Joseph Hansen's unapologetically gay insurance investigator Dave Brandstetter. Looking back in 1985, fifteen years after the fact, and again almost two decades later, Hansen recalls both the initial agonizing delay in publication and the ensuing mutual incredulity when Kahn finally came to the rescue:
But before there were reviews, there had to be a published book. And that took some doing. It also took three years. Publishers were leery of my matter-of-fact, non-apologetic approach to a subject that the rule book said had to be treated sensationally or not at all. At last a brave lady named Joan Kahn took a chance on me. When Kahn, magisterial mystery editor at Harper & Row, accepted this novel for publication, she wrote my agent, "Where's this writer been hiding?" I had to laugh to keep from crying. Hiding was the last thing I wanted to do... I'd been writing for 46 years.

Hillerman had an analogous tale to tell (a three-year travail, complete with Kahn cast as the deus ex machina), recounted shortly after his death by Jack Adrian in The Independent:
His first book, The Blessing Way (1970), took him three years to write and then three months to rewrite after Joan Kahn, the mystery editor at Harper's, sent him a detailed critique, telling him to "beef up" one of his secondary characters. "Ironically," Hillerman said, "that character was Joe Leaphorn. I'd originally had a white anthropologist as the protagonist. I owe my career to Joan Kahn."

The exact circumstances of Kahn's departure from Harper & Row in early 1980 remain unclear; contemporary press accounts offer no specifics. For her part, speaking with the Los Angeles Times in December of that year, Kahn suggests the move was her choice, a reluctant response to Harper's increasingly bottom-line orientation:
I left Harper with my heart breaking, but it was getting bigger and bigger. Since the only thing I really give a damn about is the authors, and they weren't being taken care of, I thought I'd better go and find a place that would love them more. I think little places can afford to do that.
However, in a 2011 obituary for editor Ruth Cavin, a recollection by Thomas McCormack (formerly Kahn's colleague at Harper, and later the CEO at St. Martin's Press, where Kahn would finish her career), is cited to the effect that, in 1980, Kahn, then 65, had simply been "retired" by her longtime employers. 
In any event, after leaving Harper, Kahn worked briefly at Ticknor & Fields, and then E.P. Dutton, before landing, in early 1983, at St Martin's, where she would remain until her retirement six years later. Accompanying Kahn through her many relocations were a number of her more recent discoveries from Harper, including Jack S. Scott, Richard Bulliet, E. Richard Johnson, Herbert Resnicow, Jonathan Gash, and Jane Langton, as well two Ticknor signatories, H. Paul Jeffers and Patrick McGinley.

Towards the end of her life, Kahn received two special awards from the Mystery Writers of America – first, in 1985, the Ellery Queen Award for "outstanding people in the mystery-publishing industry," and, on the occasion of her retirement in 1989, a special Edgar Award in recognition of Kahn's distinguished career. That same year, Kahn received a special Anthony Award from Bouchercon for Distinguished Contribution.

Personal life
Kahn never married and had no children. After a brief illness, she died on October 12, 1994, in Manhattan. Kahn was survived by her younger sister, artist Olivia Kahn, and three nephews. Olivia had also been Joan's colleague at Harper, acting as an advisor and manuscript reader, and shortly after her sister's death, would contribute many of her papers both to Bowling Green State University and to Joan's Alma mater Yale.

Bibliography

Author

Children's books
"Ladies and Gentlemen," said the Ringmaster (1938)
Seesaw (1964)
You Can't Catch Me (1976)
Hi, Jock, Run Around the Block (1978)

Novels
To Meet Miss Long (1943)
Open House (1946)

Editor

Anthologies
 
The Edge of the Chair (1967)
Hanging By a Thread (1969)
Some Things Dark and Dangerous (1970) 
Some Things Fierce and Fatal (1971)
Some Things Strange and Sinister (1973)
Trial and Terror (1973)

Open at Your Own Risk (1975)
Some Things Weird and Wicked (1976)
Chilling and Killing (1978)
Handle With Care: Frightening Stories (1985)
Ready or Not: Here Come Fourteen Frightening Stories! (1987)

Notes

References

Further reading
"'Open House' Second Novel of Joan Kahn". The Lewiston Evening Journal. July 20, 1946.
"Decline of the Mystery Story". The Toledo Blade. September 20, 1964.
Flora, Doris. "Search For Author Proves As Interesting As The Plot". The Tuscaloosa News. October 2, 1964.
Barkham, John. "Books in Brief: 'Edge of the Chair'". The St. Petersburg Times. November 5, 1967.
Boucher, Anthony. "Criminals at Large". The New York Times Book Review. November 13, 1967.
Nichols, Lewis. "American Notebook: Mystery Lady". The New York Times. April 28, 1968.
Hughes, Dorothy B. "The Crime File: Suspense Anthology from Joan Kahn". The Los Angeles Times. November 2, 1969.
Pryce-Jones, Alan. "In Suspense, Fiction's More Exciting Than Life". The Toledo Blade. November 9, 1969.
Kahn, Joan. "Mysteries, Junior Division". The New York Times. April 26, 1981.
Barkham, John. "Of Books and Authors: Joan Kahn of Dutton Co. Is Leading 'Mystery Editor'". The Youngstown Vindicator. September 19, 1982.
Smith, Dave. "Writers Hear Good, Bad News About Publishing". The Bend Bulletin. October 7, 1982.
Mobert, Jo (December 1, 1985). "Editor Who Loves a Good Mystery". St. Louis Post-Dispatch. p. 4B.
Mobert, Jo (December 1, 1985). "Great Mysteries for Smart Readers". St. Louis Post-Dispatch.
New York Times News Service. "Suspense Novel Editor Dies" The Kansas City Star. October 18, 1994. p.E-4.
Powell, Margaret K. "A Joan Kahn Book". Nota Bene: News from the Yale Library. Spring 1996. Volume 6, Number 2.

External links
Joan Kahn Collection at Bowling Green State University
Joan Kahn Papers. Yale Collection of American Literature, Beinecke Rare Book and Manuscript Library.

1914 births
1994 deaths
American book editors
American children's writers
20th-century American novelists
Women anthologists
Art Students League of New York alumni
Barnard College alumni
Horace Mann School alumni
Writers from Manhattan
Yale School of Art alumni
American women novelists
American women children's writers
20th-century American women writers
Novelists from New York (state)